BlackBook is an arts and culture magazine published bi-annually to print and online. Founded by Evanly Schindler in 1996 as a quarterly print publication, the now digital magazine covers topics ranging from art, music, and literature to politics, popular culture, and travel guides.

History
Schindler sold the magazine to Ari Horowitz in 2006. Vibe Holdings, whose investors include Ron Burkle and Magic Johnson, purchased the company in January 2012, forming Vibe Media. In June 2013, Vibe Media Holdings sold BlackBook to Schindler and Jon Bond of the ad agency Kirshenbaum Bond Senecal + Partners.

References

External links
Official site

Visual arts magazines published in the United States
Quarterly magazines published in the United States
Biannual magazines published in the United States
Fashion magazines published in the United States
Magazines established in 1996
Magazines published in New York City
1996 establishments in New York (state)